Quercus kerrii is an uncommon Asian species of tree in the family Fagaceae. It is native to Thailand and Vietnam. There are also populations in southern China that according to some authors belong to Q. kerrii but considered by others to belong to a different species, Q. helferiana. Quercus kerrii is placed in subgenus Cerris, section Cyclobalanopsis.

Quercus kerrii is a tree up to 20 m. tall with hairy twigs. Leaves can be as much as 240 mm long.  The acorn is oblate, 7-12 × 20–28 mm, apex depressed to flat, with a scar that is 10–20 mm in diameter and slightly convex. In China, flowering is from March–May, acorns can be found from October–November.

This species and Quercus helferiana are closely related: the relationship between them and their distribution needs further work and it is possible that Q. kerrii does not occur in China.

References

External links
line drawing, Flora of China Illustrations vol. 4, fig. 382, drawing 1 at lower left

kerrii
Flora of China
Flora of Indo-China
Trees of Vietnam
Plants described in 1911
Taxa named by William Grant Craib